Commonweal is a liberal American journal of opinion, edited and managed by lay Catholics, headquartered in The Interchurch Center in New York City. It is the oldest independent Catholic journal of opinion in the United States.

History
Founded in 1924 by Michael Williams (1877–1950) and the Calvert Associates, Commonweal is the oldest independent Roman Catholic journal of opinion in the United States. The magazine was originally modeled on The New Republic and The Nation but “expressive of the Catholic note” in covering literature, the arts, religion, society, and politics. 

Commonweal has published writings by François Mauriac, Georges Bernanos, Hannah Arendt, G. K. Chesterton, Hilaire Belloc, Jacques Maritain, Dorothy Day, Robert Bellah, Graham Greene, Emmanuel Mounier, Conor Cruise O'Brien, Thomas Merton, Wilfrid Sheed, Paul Ramsey, Joseph Bernardin, Abigail McCarthy, Christopher Lasch, Michael Novak, Alasdair MacIntyre, Charles Taylor, Thomas Mallon, Walter Kerr, Marilynne Robinson, Luke Timothy Johnson, Terry Eagleton, Elizabeth Johnson, George Scialabba, Phil Klay and Andrew Bacevich. It has printed the short fiction of Evelyn Waugh, J. F. Powers, Alice McDermott, Whittaker Chambers, and Valerie Sayers; the poetry of W. H. Auden, Robert Lowell, Theodore Roethke, John Updike, Les Murray, John Berryman, and Marie Ponsot; and the artwork of Jean Charlot, Rita Corbin, Fritz Eichenberg, and Emil Antonucci.

Overview
The journal, tagged as "A Review of Religion, Politics, and Culture", is run as a not-for-profit enterprise and managed by a twenty-six-member board of directors. The word "commonweal" is a reference to an important term in the political philosophy of Thomas Aquinas, who argued that legitimate leaders must prioritize "the common good" or "the commonweal" in making political decisions.

Commonweal publishes editorials, columns, essays, and poetry, along with film, book, and theater reviews. Eleven issues of Commonweal are released each year, with a circulation of approximately 20,000. In 1951, Commonweal was hit by financial troubles and almost shut down because of a loss in subscribers.

Viewpoint
Although Commonweal maintains a relatively strong focus on issues of specific interest to liberal Catholics, this focus is not exclusionary. A broad range of issues—religious, political, social, and cultural—are examined independent of any relationship to Catholicism and the church.  Commonweal has attracted contributors from all points of the mainstream political spectrum in the United States.

Commonweal published several articles in support of censured theologian Roger Haight in 2001, 2007, and 2009.

See also
 America
 Catholic Worker
 Faith & Family
 National Catholic Register
 National Catholic Reporter
 Zenit News Agency

Notes

References

Further reading
Rodger Van Allen, The Commonweal and American Catholicism: The Magazine, the Movement, the Meaning, Philadelphia: Fortune Press, 1974
Rodger Van Allen, Being Catholic: Commonweal from the Seventies to the Nineties, Loyola University Press, 1993
Patrick Jordan and Paul Baumann, Commonweal Confronts the Century: Liberal Convictions, Catholic Tradition, Touchstone, 1999
Robert B. Clements (1972).  "The Commonweal:  The Williams-Shuster Years"

External links 

 

Catholic magazines published in the United States
Magazines established in 1924
Magazines published in New York City